Electrons in free space can carry quantized orbital angular momentum (OAM) projected along the direction of propagation. This orbital angular momentum corresponds to helical wavefronts, or, equivalently, a phase proportional to the azimuthal angle. Electron beams with quantized orbital angular momentum are also called electron vortex beams.

Theory 
By measuring the momentum of the electron, its wave function must collapse and give a particular value. If the energy of the electron beam is selected beforehand, the  total momentum (not its directional components) of the electrons is fixed to a certain degree of precision.
When the Schrödinger equation is written in the cylindrical coordinate system, the solutions are no longer plane waves, but instead are given by Bessel beams, solutions that are a linear combination of  that is, the product of three types of functions: a plane wave with momentum   in the -direction, a radial component written as a Bessel function of the first kind , where  is the linear momentum in the radial direction, and finally an azimuthal component written as  where  (sometimes written ) is the magnetic quantum number related to the angular momentum  in the -direction. Thus, the dispersion relation reads  . By azimuthal symmetry, the wave function has the property that   is necessarily an integer, thus  is quantized.

Note that the equations above follow for any free quantum particle with mass, not necessarily electrons. The quantization of  can also be shown in the spherical coordinate system, where the wave function reduces to a product of spherical Bessel functions and spherical harmonics.

Preparation 

There are a variety of methods to prepare an electron in an orbital angular momentum state. All methods involve an interaction with an optical element such that the electron acquires an azimuthal phase. The optical element can be material, magnetostatic, or electrostatic. It is possible to either directly imprint an azimuthal phase, or to imprint an azimuthal phase with a holographic diffraction grating, where grating pattern is defined by the interference of the azimuthal phase and a planar or spherical carrier wave.

Applications 

Electron vortex beams have a variety of proposed and demonstrated applications, including for mapping magnetization, studying chiral molecules and chiral plasmon resonances, and identification of crystal chirality.

Measurement 
Interferometric methods borrowed from light optics also work to determine the orbital angular momentum of free electrons in pure states. Interference with a planar reference wave, diffractive filtering and self-interference can serve to characterize a prepared electron orbital angular momentum state. In order to measure the orbital angular momentum of a superposition or of the mixed state that results from interaction with an atom or material, a non-interferometric method is necessary. Wavefront flattening, transformation of an orbital angular momentum state into a planar wave, or cylindrically symmetric Stern-Gerlach-like measurement is necessary to measure the orbital angular momentum mixed or superposition state.

References

Angular momentum
Electron beam
Electron microscopy
Orbital angular momentum of waves